Leisha  is a feminine given name of Old Germanic origin, a variant of Alice via Alicia. It may also be linked with the name of the male prophet Elisha in the Old Testament. The meaning of Leisha is noble or exalted. Leisha is a relatively uncommon name, the highest position it has reached in the United States being 1235th in the 1960s.

Notable people
Leisha Hailey (born 1971), American actress
Leisha Harvey (born 1947), Australian politician
Leisha Medina (born 1986), Venezuelan voice actress
Leisha Santorelli (born 1985), Journalist
Leisha Stevens (born 1969), Australian soprano

References

English feminine given names
Feminine given names